Carling Bassett was the defending champion but did not compete that year.

Sandra Cecchini won in the final 6–3, 6–0 against Judith Wiesner.

Seeds
A champion seed is indicated in bold text while text in italics indicates the round in which that seed was eliminated.

  Natasha Zvereva (semifinals)
  Sandra Cecchini (champion)
  Stephanie Rehe (second round)
  Helen Kelesi (second round)
  Anne Minter (quarterfinals)
  Leila Meskhi (second round)
  Isabel Cueto (second round)
  Elly Hakami (first round)

Draw

References
 1988 Internationaux de Strasbourg draw

1988
1988 WTA Tour
1988 in French tennis